Kazi Nazrul University (KNU) is a Public State aided research university  in Asansol, West Bengal. The university has been named after the poet Kazi Nazrul Islam. The university was established under the Kazi Nazrul University Act, 2012. Assent of the Governor was first published in the Kolkata gazette, extraordinary 16 August 2012.

History 
There was a demand for a university in the area from a long time. The setting up of Kazi Nazrul University was primarily intended at responding to these local-material needs of democratizing higher education, outside of urban-metropolitan centers of cultural dominance. Professor Anuradha Mukhopadhyay, the first Vice Chancellor, assumed office on 3 December 2012 at the Asansol Durgapur Development Authority (ADDA) building. On 10 January 2013, the Hon'ble Chief Minister of West Bengal Smt. Mamata Banerjee laid the foundation stone of Kazi Nazrul University on its own campus, close to the birthplace of Kazi Nazrul Islam at Churulia, 31 kilometres away from the city of Asansol. Anuradha Mukherjee was the first vice-chancellor of Kazi Nazrul University.

In July 2013, the university inaugurated its teaching programs by commencing post graduation classes in four core disciplines – Bengali, English, History and Mathematics – with about one hundred and twenty students. In the academic session 2014-15 four new Postgraduate courses, including M.A in education, Hindi, Political Science & M.Com., had been introduced. Professor Sadhan Chakraborti joined as the Vice-Chancellor of Kazi Nazrul University in April 2015. Over time, 17 PG departments have started functioning with all necessary infrastructures on the campus of the university and with an actual intake of 1269 students in the academic year 2018–19. On 2018 in a Special convocation The University Honored Prime Minister of Bangladesh Sheikh Hasina with honorary Doctorate of Literature.

Organisation and administration

Governance

The Vice-chancellor of the Kazi Nazrul University is the chief executive officer of the university. Sadhan Chakrabarti is the current Vice-chancellor of the university.

Faculties and Schools
Kazi Nazrul University has 19 departments organized into five faculty councils.

 Faculty Council for Post-Graduate Studies in Science, Technology and Vocational Studies

This faculty consists of the departments of Mathematics, Physics, Chemistry, Computer Science, Animal Science, Applied Psychology.

 Faculty Council for Post-Graduate Studies in Arts, Fine Arts, Performing Arts, and Traditional Art Forms

This faculty council consists of the departments of Bengali, English, Hindi, Urdu, History, Political Science, Geography, and Education .

 Faculty Council for Post-Graduate Studies in Commerce and Management

This faculty consists of the departments of  Commerce.

Faculty Council for Post-Graduate Studies in Law, Education, Journalism and Mass Communication, Library Science and Physical Education

This faculty consists of the departments of  Law and Education.

 School of Health Science and Technology
School of Mines And Metallurgy

On 2016 CM Mamata Banerjee gave clearance to set up Institute for Mines, Minerals and Metallurgic Sciences in Asansol under Kazi Nazrul University, now University offers courses like Diploma, B.Tech., B.Sc., M.Sc. and PhD. 7 acres of plot has been allotted for institute campus.
The School of Mines And Metallurgy consists of the Department Of Mining Engineering and Metallurgical Engineering and Computer Science and Engineering (Data Science)

Centre
Nazrul Centre for Social & Cultural Studies

Affliations
The university is an affiliating institution and has jurisdiction over the colleges of the Paschim Bardhaman district.

Academics

Admission

 For UG & PG:                                                                                                                                                                                                                                                                          Good marks in the higher secondary (10+2) and graduation (10+2+3) levels are necessary for admission in the undergraduate and postgraduate courses offered by the university.
 For B.Tech:                                                                                                                                                                                                                                                             Admission through Centralized Counselling based on WBJEE rank conducted by West Bengal Joint Entrance Examination Board and time to time notification issued by Department of Higher Education, Govt. of West Bengal. also students can admitted through Joint Entrance for Lateral Entry (JELET) exam conducted by West Bengal Joint Entrance Examination Board in lateral entry in 2nd year (3rd semester) of the four-year course of bachelor's degree in technology.
 For MCA:                                                                                                                                                                                                                                                                 Admission through Centralized Counselling based on JECA rank conducted by West Bengal Joint Entrance Examination Board in 2 years of Master of Computer Application (MCA) course.

Accreditation
The University Grants Commission (U.G.C.) accorded recognition to the university in terms of Section 12B of the U.G.C. Act, in 2019.

In September 2021, The university has been awarded Grade B with a CGPA of 2.1 by the NAAC.

Notable alumni
Minakshi Mukherjee, the state president of DYFI
Agnimitra Paul, Indian fashion designer
Bansa Gopal Chowdhury, the member of Parliament

See also
 List of universities in India
 Universities and colleges of West Bengal

References

External links

Official website

 
Universities and colleges in Paschim Bardhaman district
Education in Asansol
Kazi Nazrul Islam
Educational institutions established in 2012
2012 establishments in West Bengal